Hedyosmum nutans is a plant that was described by Olof Swartz. It is part of the genus Hedyosmum of the family Chloranthaceae. No subspecies are listed in the Catalogue of Life.

References

nutans
Taxa named by Olof Swartz